WMOT is a public radio station serving the metropolitan Nashville, Tennessee market. Licensed to Murfreesboro, Tennessee, it is owned by the Middle Tennessee State University, located in nearby Murfreesboro, Tennessee, and it broadcasts an Americana-based format branded as Roots Radio.

Due to its location, WMOT's signal is strongest and clearest in Nashville and surrounding counties.

History
Originally started in April 1969 employing various forms of pop and rock music that was aimed at a student listenership, WMOT ran a full-time jazz music format between 1982 and 2009, aimed at a somewhat larger, more adult audience. By the late 2000s, WMOT was one of only a handful of U.S. public radio stations employing a jazz format full-time, without filling much of the broadcast day with news and other genres. At various times in the station's history, it has broadcast MTSU football and basketball games as well; WMOT has broadcast those athletic contests mainly because of the lack of interest from commercial stations in the immediate Murfreesboro or Nashville markets in doing so.

In 1995, the MTSU student government body started another college radio station, WMTS-FM, to serve the campus audience once served by WMOT.

In 2008, WMOT lost its annual grant from the Corporation for Public Broadcasting (CPB), due to a number of factors. This loss of revenue, along with appropriations cuts by the state of Tennessee, prompted MTSU officials to consider discontinuing the station in early 2009. However, in late 2009, the university decided to instead merge WMOT's operations into a consortium with the other MTSU media (such as WMTS and the student newspaper) titled the Media Convergence Center, with consequent reductions in the station's subsidy, in order to avoid closing it down.

Along with the reorganization, WMOT decided to make radical scheduling changes, notably discontinuing its exclusively jazz format in order to appeal to a wider audience in the Nashville market. In October 2009, WMOT added news and talk programming to the morning and afternoon "drive time" slots between 5 and 9 a.m. and 4 to 6 p.m. from the BBC and Public Radio International. However, after Nashville public radio outlet WPLN-FM discontinued classical music programming during the daytime on weekdays in 2009, WMOT decided in February 2011 to fill the void by replacing jazz with classical between 9 a.m. and 3 p.m., formerly the hours when WPLN broadcast that format, in order to gain listeners seeking that format. WMOT also brought back, after many years' absence, National Public Radio's flagship program, All Things Considered, although it duplicated the program's carriage by WPLN (as did the NPR hourly news updates). ATC was dropped after the format change in 2016 (see below).

The situation among public broadcasters in the Nashville market became more complicated later that year when that WPLN's parent organization, Nashville Public Radio, acquired the Vanderbilt University student-run station WRVU in June, converting it into an all-classical format under the WFCL callsign, while the main WPLN signal became a full-time news-and-talk outlet. In November 2020, WFCL itself changed formats (and callsign to WNXP) to adult album alternative, intended partly to compete against the current WMOT format.

On August 26, 2016, it was announced that WMOT would switch to an Americana-based format on September 2, 2016, in partnership with the syndicated music program Music City Roots. College of Media and Entertainment Dean Ken Paulson explained that the new format was meant to "truly [reflect] both Nashville's musical past and present", adding that they wanted WMOT's content to "become more tightly integrated with our educational opportunities at the college". The program's co-creator John Walker praised the partnership, stating that "We've always dreamed there would be a radio station that would fully embrace the Roots, Americana music going on all over the country, but centered right here in Middle Tennessee." The previous jazz format moved to WMOT-HD2, simulcasting on 92.3 W222BZ in Bluhmtown, and later also 104.9 W285FB in Bellevue.

Programming currently includes the nationally syndicated shows Hangin' & Sangin''', The String, and Bel-Aire Drive''. Webb Wilder, a Nashville-based alternative rock artist, serves as an afternoon disc jockey on WMOT as of late 2020.

HD Radio
WMOT carries two HD Radio subchannels: WMOT-HD2 carried "old-time radio" programs until September 2, 2016, when it switched to WMOT's former classical and jazz format (now carrying strictly jazz, as noted above), and WMOT-HD3 simulcasts WMTS-FM.

Translators

See also
 List of Nashville media

References

External links
 WMOT official website
 WMOT-HD2 official website

Middle Tennessee State University
MOT
Radio stations established in 1969
NPR member stations
1969 establishments in Tennessee